Dance Dance Revolution Hottest Party 3, released in Japan as Dance Dance Revolution: Music Fit (ダンスダンスレボリューション：ミュージックフィット, Dansu Dansu Reboryūshon: Myūjikku Fitto), is a rhythm-based dancing game for the Wii. It is a video game released by Konami in 2009. The game can be played using a dance pad, the classic controller, or the Wii Remote and Nunchuck combination. It has two games preceding it: Dance Dance Revolution Hottest Party and Dance Dance Revolution Hottest Party 2.

Gameplay
Gameplay remains relatively unchanged from the original game. New modes on Dance Dance Revolution Hottest Party 3 include Tournament Mode, Relaxed Mode, DDR School, Hypermove Mode, and Wii Balance Board Modes. Returning modes include Free Play Mode and Training Mode. Dropped modes include the "Groove Circuit/Arena" Mode. It has been replaced with Tournament Mode. The use of hand markers have been removed from Free Play Mode. They are still existent in DDR School and Hypermove Mode, but are called Punch Markers.

Arrows
In game, arrow timing is scored based on a system with Marvelous, Perfect, Great, Good, Almost (merged with Good), and Miss. If four arrows are stepped on consecutively with a "Great" score or higher, a combo is started. If a full combo is reached, a "Full Combo Finished" message should appear at the end of a song.

Gimmicks
Unlike the two games preceding this one, gimmicks must be unlocked to be used in game. New gimmicks include the Sudden Arrow, the Minimizer and Normalizer, and Diagonal Arrows.

Music
The songs in red are "boss songs." The songs with padlocks next to them are locked until certain conditions are met in the game, and songs with a clapperboard next to them have music videos featured.

See also
Dance Dance Revolution Hottest Party
Dance Dance Revolution Hottest Party 2

References

2009 video games
Dance Dance Revolution games
Video games developed in Japan
Wii-only games
Wii games